Player Games is a statistic used to estimate the number of games a player is responsible for.  It was developed by Dean Oliver, the first full-time statistical analyst in the NBA.

Player Games=Team Games*((3*(Poss/Team Poss)+3*(Stops/Team Stops)+(Minutes Played/Team Minutes Played))/7)

It places a high weight on the number of offensive and defensive possessions accounted for by a player rather than making player games a function based solely on minutes.

Stops are a player or teams estimated defensive stops. More information about that stat can be found in the book Basketball on Paper.

References
 https://www.basketball-reference.com/about/glossary.html

Basketball statistics